LSK Kvinner Fotballklubb is a Norwegian women's football club from Lillestrøm. They currently play in Toppserien, the top division of Norwegian football. The club was founded as Setskog/Høland Fotballklubb on 10 October 1989.

History

The club was founded in 1989 as a merger between the women's football branches of Setskog IF and Høland IL. It was known as Setskog/Høland FK and played their home games on AHF-banen in Bjørkelangen, Aurskog-Høland.

Before the 2001 season the club was relocated from Bjørkelangen to Strømmen and the name was changed to Team Strømmen. Team Strømmen finished the 2008 season in 2nd position in Toppserien, the top division of Norwegian football. They lost 1–3 against league champions Røa IL in the Norwegian Cup final on Bislett Stadion on 8 November 2008.

From 2010 the team will be a part of Lillestrøm SK. Thus changing its name to LSK Kvinner FK, as well as the logo and kits likewise. LSK Kvinner won six consecutive Toppserien titles from 2014 to 2019.

Recent seasons 
{|class="wikitable"
|-bgcolor="#efefef"
! Season
! 
! Pos.
! Pl.
! W
! D
! L
! GS
! GA
! P
!Cup
!Notes
|-
|2005
|TS
|align=right bgcolor=silver|2
|align=right|18||align=right|12||align=right|3||align=right|3
|align=right|44||align=right|22||align=right|39
|bgcolor=silver|Runner-up
|
|-
|2006
|TS
|align=right |4
|align=right|18||align=right|12||align=right|2||align=right|4
|align=right|46||align=right|25||align=right|38
||Quarter-final
|
|-
|2007
|TS
|align=right |5
|align=right|22||align=right|10||align=right|6||align=right|6
|align=right|37||align=right|29||align=right|36
||Quarter-final
|
|-
|2008
|TS
|align=right bgcolor=silver|2
|align=right|22||align=right|14||align=right|4||align=right|4
|align=right|44||align=right|22||align=right|46
|bgcolor=silver|Runner-up
|
|-
|2009
|TS
|align=right |4
|align=right|22||align=right|11||align=right|3||align=right|8
|align=right|48||align=right|31||align=right|36
|bgcolor=silver|Runner-up
|Last season as Team Strømmen FK
|-
|2010
|TS
|align=right |6
|align=right|22||align=right|11||align=right|3||align=right|8
|align=right|42||align=right|32||align=right|36
|Semi-final
|First season as LSK Kvinner FK
|-
|2011 
|TS
|align=right |5
|align=right|22||align=right|13||align=right|1||align=right|8
|align=right|47||align=right|42||align=right|40
|Quarter-final
|
|-
|2012 
|TS
|align=right bgcolor=gold|1
|align=right|22||align=right|18||align=right|2||align=right|2
|align=right|66||align=right|17||align=right|56
|Quarter-final
|
|-
|2013 
|TS
|align=right bgcolor=silver|2
|align=right|22||align=right|15||align=right|4||align=right|3
|align=right|51||align=right|18||align=right|49
|Semi-final
|
|-
|2014 
|TS
|align=right bgcolor=gold|1
|align=right|22||align=right|18||align=right|3||align=right|1
|align=right|64||align=right|14||align=right|57
|bgcolor=gold|Winner
|
|-
|2015 
|TS
|align=right bgcolor=gold|1
|align=right|22||align=right|18||align=right|2||align=right|2
|align=right|58||align=right|16||align=right|56
|bgcolor=gold|Winner
|
|-
|2016 
|TS
|align=right bgcolor=gold|1
|align=right|22||align=right|19||align=right|3||align=right|0
|align=right|88||align=right|10||align=right|60
|bgcolor=gold|Winner
|
|-
|2017
|TS
|align=right bgcolor=gold | 1
|align=right | 22 || align=right | 19 || align=right | 2 || align=right | 1
|align=right | 68 || align=right | 18 || align=right | 59
|Semi-final
|
|-
|2018 
|TS
|align=right bgcolor=gold | 1
|align=right | 22 || align=right | 20 || align=right | 1 || align=right | 1
|align=right | 71 || align=right | 15 || align=right | 61
|bgcolor=gold|Winner
|
|-
|2019 
|TS
|align=right bgcolor=gold | 1
|align=right | 22 || align=right | 15 || align=right | 5 || align=right | 2
|align=right | 51 || align=right | 18 || align=right | 50
|bgcolor=gold|Winner
|
|-
|2020 
|TS
|align=right | 5
|align=right | 18 || align=right | 9 || align=right | 2 || align=right | 7
|align=right | 29 || align=right | 23 || align=right | 29
|bgcolor=silver|Runner-up
|
|-
|2021 
|TS
|align=right bgcolor=cc9966 | 3
|align=right | 18 || align=right | 12 || align=right | 1 || align=right | 5
|align=right | 46 || align=right | 32 || align=right | 37
||Semi-final
|
|}

Players

Current squad

Former players

Achievements
Toppserien
Champions (7): 2012, 2014, 2015, 2016, 2017, 2018, 2019
Runners-up (5): 1992, 1995, 2005, 2008, 2013

 Norwegian Women's Cup
Winners (6): 1992, 2014, 2015, 2016, 2018, 2019
Runners-up (3): 2005, 2008, 2009

UEFA Competitions
 Quarter-final in UEFA Women's Champions League: 2018–19

European record
UEFA Women's Champions League:
 2009–10: Qualifying round (as Team Strømmen)
 2013–14: Round of 32
 2015–16: Round of 16
 2016–17: Round of 32
 2017–18: Round of 16
 2018–19: Quarter-finals
 2019–20: Qualifying round

References

External links
 Official site

Lillestrøm SK
LSK Kvinner
Association football clubs established in 1989
Sport in Skedsmo
1989 establishments in Norway